Antoine Marcel Lemoine (born Paris November 3, 1763, died Paris April, 1817) was the founder of the music publishing establishment in Paris and a guitar virtuoso and skilful performer on the violin and viola. He was also the father of Henry Lemoine, who took over his publishing business.

Antoine Lemoine's father was  a dramatic artist, who gave him his first elementary lessons on the guitar and violin, but beyond this rudimentary instruction Lemoine was self-taught. His father led a wandering, restless life.  When Antoine Lemoine was sixteen-and-a-half years old he was married and for the next few years followed the example of his parents, wandering with his wife and obtaining a livelihood by violin and guitar playing.

In 1781 he settled in Paris and obtained employment as violinist in the Theatre Montansier in Versailles; after playing in the orchestra for two years, he resigned this position to commence as a teacher of the guitar and violin in Paris. During the year 1789 he was worked in the Theatre Monsieur orchestra as alto player.

In 1772, he began a music publishing business, called A l'Espérance (To Hope), which was  continued after his death by his son Henry as Henry Lemoine and Company. The business has flourished and by 1914 was well known for the number of good-quality compositions issued for the mandolin and guitar. In 1790 another publisher, Imbault of Paris, published several of Lemoine's compositions and theoretical works, including a method for the guitar. This rapidly passed several editions. Three years later Lemoine devoted himself entirely to music publishing, but after the revolution, he placed his business under capable management and officiated as conductor successively of the orchestras of the Theatre Molière, Mareux, and of the Rue Culture and St. Catherine.

Although Lemoine had received no instruction in harmony or counterpoint, he successfully  composed, arranged, and orchestrated all the music performed in these theatres. In 1795 he revised and augmented his method for the guitar, publishing this edition himself. Additionally, he, continued to write compositions for other publishers;  he also issued about twenty-five of his own works, consisting of variations, potpourris, etc., for guitar solo and duos for guitar and violin.

When the six-stringed guitar, constructed in the shape of a lyre and named the lyre-guitar, became fashionable at the beginning of the nineteenth century, Lemoine wrote and published (in 1805) a new elementary treatise for this instrument under the title of Method for the guitar of six strings, but a few years later his compositions for the guitar were eclipsed by those of Ferdinando Carulli. Lemoine, however, was fully aware of the superiority of the later works of this rising generation of guitar virtuosi and he was among the first to issue the compositions of Ferdinando Carulli, Fernando Sor, Luigi Sagrini, Dionisio Aguado, Mauro Giuliani, Joseph Küffner and Luigi Castellacci.

References

1763 births
1817 deaths
French guitarists
French male guitarists
French performance artists
French composers
French male composers
19th-century French male violinists
18th-century French male violinists
French music educators
Musicians from Paris
French male writers